Payscale is an American compensation software and data company which helps employers manage employee compensation and employees understand their worth in the job market. The website was launched on January 1, 2002. It was founded by Joe Giordano and John Gaffney. Mike Metzger served as CEO from 2004 to 2019. Scott Torrey, a 20-year veteran of SAP Concur, started as CEO on August 26, 2019 and stepped down on November 16, 2021. The current CEO of PayScale is Alex Hart.
 

On April 24, 2014, Warburg Pincus acquired Payscale in a deal worth up to $100 million. 

On April 25, 2019, Francisco Partners announced a majority investment in Payscale at an enterprise value of $325 million.

Overview
Payscale was developed to help people and businesses obtain accurate, real-time information on job market compensation. While Payscale started by crowdsourcing compensation data from employees to power its products for employers, its Software as a Service offerings have evolved to allow businesses to utilize multiple compensation data sources, including Payscale's Crowdsourced and Company Sourced offerings as well as data from other providers. Customers can also manage their employee compensation strategy and structure within the platform and perform robust compensation analytics. For employees, the service works via the Internet by enabling individuals to submit their job profile and salary data, which is then compared to others like them. They receive a free report on their market worth. 

The company generates revenue by selling SaaS subscriptions, compensation data and services to employers, to aid in determining correct market rates for hiring, benchmarking and budgeting, and by targeted advertising to employees that visit its website.

Payscale surveys its users' income and background, and since 2007, it has published an annual ranking of American colleges and universities by their estimated return on investment. The rankings have been popular with the public but controversial among scholars of higher education.

Payscale puts on an annual compensation industry event called Compference and publishes original research on compensation-related topics such as the gender pay gap, college return on investment and salary history.

In 2021, Payscale merged with Payfactors, a leading competitor. The new company operates under the Payscale brand. Later that year, Payscale acquired pay equity and compensation management company CURO. In 2022, Payscale acquired Agora, a software development company focused on pay transparency and employee experience.

References

External links 
 

Online databases
Companies based in Seattle
2002 establishments in Washington (state)
Privately held companies based in Washington (state)
American companies established in 2002
Online companies of the United States
Internet properties established in 2002
2014 mergers and acquisitions